Tobias Bayer (born 17 November 1999) is an Austrian racing cyclist, who currently rides for UCI ProTeam .

Bayer rode his first Grand Tour, Vuelta a España in 2021 and supported his captain and sprinter Jasper Phillipsen in two stage victories. In 2021 he became Austrian national champion in the U23 category (in road race and time trials).

Major results
2019
 5th Road race, National Road Championships
 9th Croatia–Slovenia
 10th Overall Giro del Friuli-Venezia Giulia
2020
 1st  Time trial, National Under-23 Road Championships
 7th Overall Giro della Friuli Venezia Giulia
2021
 National Road Championships
2nd Time trial
4th Road race
 9th Overall Boucles de la Mayenne
 10th Road race, UEC European Under-23 Road Championships
 10th Road race, UCI Road World Under-23 Championships
2022
 3rd Brussels Cycling Classic
 5th Time trial, National Road Championships

Grand Tour general classification results timeline

References

External links
 

1999 births
Living people
Austrian male cyclists
Place of birth missing (living people)
People from Ried im Innkreis District
Sportspeople from Upper Austria